National Route 180 (N180) is a secondary national route that forms part of the Philippine highway network, running from Cubao, Quezon City to Ermita, Manila.

Route description
N180 follows a route that stars at Cubao in Quezon City, which then passes through the district of New Manila in Quezon City, the city of San Juan, Quezon City once again, and the districts of Santa Mesa, Sampaloc, Quiapo, San Miguel, and Ermita in Manila. The highway connects key locations on its route, and runs through the heart of Manila. The highway continues westward as Padre Burgos Avenue (N180) and eastward as a continuation of Aurora Boulevard (N59). The highway's section from EDSA in Quezon City to Recto Avenue/Mendiola Street in Manila forms part of Radial Road 6 (R-6), while the rest of the route up to Taft Avenue forms part of Circumferential Road 1 (C-1).

The LRT Line 2 runs on top of the route, utilizing the center island on most segments.

Aurora Boulevard

Starting in Cubao, N180 follows Aurora Boulevard which runs on a four lane highway primarily in New Manila passing through intersections such as Betty Go-Belmonte Street and Gilmore Avenue (N184). Then it briefly crosses to San Juan crossing through major crossings such as J. Ruiz street. It then terminates at its intersection with G. Araneta Avenue (N130) wherein it continues westward after the intersection as Magsaysay Boulevard (N180). LRT Line 2 runs on the center island through the entirety of this segment.

Magsaysay Boulevard

As it enters Santa Mesa and Sampaloc, Manila, N180 becomes Magsaysay Boulevard which runs on an eight lane highway passing through intersections such as Victorino Mapa Street (N141) and Pureza Street before it terminates at Lacson Avenue and Nagtahan Street (N140) at the Nagtahan Interchange. It then terminates at the Magsaysay Boulevard-Legarda Street Flyover at the interchange wherein it continues westward as Legarda Street (N180). LRT Line 2 runs on the center island almost through the entirety of this segment.

Legarda Street

As it crosses the Nagtahan Interchange, Legarda Street takes over the N180 designation which runs as a four-lane road passing through intersections such as Earnshaw Street and Recto Avenue (N145) before it terminates at Nepomuceno Street (N180) which briefly takes over the route. LRT Line 2 runs on the center island from Lacson Avenue to Earnshaw Street, after which it deviates by turning towards Recto Avenue westward.

Nepomuceno Street
N180 briefly becomes Nepomuceno Street until its junction with P. Casal Street which takes over the route.

P. Casal Street

From its intersection at Nepomuceno Street, P. Casal Street takes over the N180 designation until before it crosses the Pasig River as the Ayala Bridge.

Ayala Boulevard
Ayala Boulevard takes over N180 from Ayala Bridge to Taft Avenue (N170).

Finance Road
Finance Road is the last short segment of N180 starts from the Taft Avenue (N170) intersection until its western end at Padre Burgos Avenue (N150), where it merges with towards Manila Bay.

References

Roads in Metro Manila